"Priceless" is a song by Canadian R&B singer Melanie Fiona from her debut album, The Bridge (2009). The song was produced by JK and Dan Strong, written by Raymond Angry, Claude Kelly
and Dan Wilenski.

Track listing

Personnel
Lead vocals – Melanie Fiona
Producer's – JK and Dan Strong
Lyrics – Raymond Angry, Claude Kelly and Daniel Wilenski
Label: SRC, Universal Motown

Chart performance

References

External links
Official website

2010 singles
Melanie Fiona songs
Songs written by Claude Kelly
2009 songs
SRC Records singles
Universal Motown Records singles